Cangzhou Stadium is a football stadium in Cangzhou, China. The stadium holds 31,836 spectators.  It broke ground on May 6, 2010  and opened in 2011.

References

Football venues in China